A French Woman is a 1995 French drama film directed by Régis Wargnier.

Plot
Shortly after marrying Louis (Daniel Auteuil), a French military officer, Jeanne (Emmanuelle Béart) must face solitude as Louis is sent to fight in World War II. While waiting for his return from a POW camp, Jeanne gets involved on different affairs with his husband's comrades-in-arms. When he finally returns home and finds out about his wife's cheating, he forgives her and offers her freedom, but she refuses to accept and they come back together. Looking for a new life, the family (now with two twins) move to Berlin, where Jeanne meets Matthias, a German industrialist who falls in love with her. A third child is born and shortly after, Louis is summoned to the First Indochina War, forcing his family to return to France.

During his husband's absence, Jeanne gets involved in an affair with Matthias, who has followed her to France. They try to escape with the children but their attempt is frustrated by Louis' brother. Louis returns home and, in an attempt to get Matthias out of her life, Jeanne uses her influence to move the family to Damascus. Despite her apparent success, she asks Matthias to go to Damascus and take her with him. When he shows up, Louis fights him but is  severely injured by Jeanne. The family returns to France, where Louis is asked to fight in Algeria. Haunted by loneliness and despair, Jeanne once again finds Matthias, but he breaks up with her for good. Louis returns and meets his family, but he has to part again. During his absence, Jeanne dies without a cause, but he later finds in her purse a newspaper clipping informing of Matthias' death.

Cast
 Emmanuelle Béart as Jeanne
 Daniel Auteuil as Louis
 Gabriel Barylli as Mathias Behrens
 Jean-Claude Brialy as Arnoult
 Geneviève Casile as Solange
 Michel Etcheverry as Charles
 Laurence Masliah as Helene
 Jean-Noël Brouté as Marc
 Isabelle Guiard as Mathilde
 François Caron as Andre
 Maria Fitzi as Liseul
 Samuel Le Bihan as Henri
 Pierre Cassignard as The Inspector

Awards
 19th Moscow International Film Festival
 Silver St. George for the Direction: Régis Wargnier
 Silver St. George (Best Actor): Gabriel Barylli
 Silver St. George (Best Actress): Emmanuelle Béart

References

External links
 

1995 films
1995 drama films
1990s French-language films
French drama films
Films directed by Régis Wargnier
Films scored by Patrick Doyle
1990s French films